Harald Maier (born 17 November 1960) is an Austrian former professional racing cyclist. He rode in three editions of the Tour de France, one edition of the Giro d'Italia and two editions of the Vuelta a España. He was the overall winner of the 1985 Giro del Trentino.

References

External links

1960 births
Living people
Austrian male cyclists
People from Graz-Umgebung District
Sportspeople from Styria
20th-century Austrian people